The Szekszárd Abbey was a Benedictine monastery established in Szekszárd in the Kingdom of Hungary in 1061. It is dedicated to the Holy Savior.

References

Sources

Szekszard